SS-100 or SS 100 may refer to:

 SS-100-X, the United States Secret Service code name for the Presidential limousine used by President John F. Kennedy
 Brough Superior SS100, a motorcycle
 SS Jaguar 100, an automobile
 Sukhoi Superjet 100, a regional jet
 , a United States Navy submarine which saw service during World War I